Transport in Egypt is centered in Cairo and largely follows the pattern of settlement along the Nile. The Ministry of Transportation and other government bodies are responsible for transportation in Egypt, whether by sea, river, land or air.

With regards to rail, air and waterway travel, the main line of the nation's rail system follows along the Nile river and is operated by Egyptian National Railways. In addition to overseas routes, Egypt Air provides domestic air service to major tourist destinations from its Cairo hub. The Nile River system (about ) and the principal canals are important locally for transportation. People still travel via the Nile, mainly between Cairo and Aswan. The Suez Canal is a major waterway for international commerce and navigation, linking the Mediterranean and Red Sea. Major ports are Alexandria, Port Said, Damietta on the Mediterranean and Suez and Safaga on the Red Sea.

With regards to driving, Egypt has one of the highest incidents of road fatalities, per miles driven, in the world. Traffic rules are routinely ignored by impatient drivers.

Road system

Two routes in the Trans-African Highway network originate in Cairo. Egypt also has multiple highway links with Asia through the Arab Mashreq International Road Network.
Egypt has a developing motorway network, connecting Cairo with Alexandria and other cities. Though most of the transport in the country is still done on the national highways, motorways are becoming increasingly an option in road transport within the country. The existing motorways in the country are:

International Coastal Road: It runs from Alexandria to Port Said, along the Northern Nile Delta. Also, amongst other cities, it connects Damietta and Baltim.
Geish Road: It runs between Helwan and Asyut, along the Nile River, also connecting Beni Suef and Minya.
Ring Road: It serves as an inner ring-road for Cairo.
Regional Ring Road: It serves as an outer ring road for Cairo, also connecting its suburbs like Helwan and 10th of Ramadan City.

Plus, Egypt has developed an extensive system of 4-lane highways that can be classified as freeways, because they serve as normal roads and do not discriminate the traffic on it, thus rendering them slower than motorways.

Railways 

The Egyptian railway system is the oldest railway network in Africa and the Middle East and the second oldest in the world. The first line between Alexandria and Kafer Eassa was opened in 1854. ENR carries about 800 million passengers and 12 million tonnes of freight annually.

A major investment programme was planned to begin in 2007 with the aim of modernizing the rail network and improving safety standards. Trains are usually a safe means of transportation in Egypt.

The city of Cairo is served by the Cairo Metro, which is run by the National Authority for Tunnels.
In addition to the city of Alexandria that is served by the Alexandria Tram

Waterways 

The Suez Canal,  (including approaches), is used by oceangoing vessels, drawing up to 17.68 m of water (2011).

Pipelines 
As of 2018 the information in the CIA World Factbook states the following regarding Egypt's pipelines: "condensate 486 km; condensate/gas 74 km; gas 7,986 km; liquid petroleum gas 957 km; oil 5,225 km; oil/gas/water 37 km; refined products 895 km; water 65 km (2013)"

Ports
Egypt has 15 commercial ports and 29 specialized ports. The specialized ports include 5 tourist seaports, 12 petroleum seaports, 6 mining seaports, and 
6 fishing seaports.

Commercial Ports
 Alexandria Port
 El-Dekheila Port
 Damietta Port
 Port Said Port
 East Port Said Port
 Arish Port
 Suez Port
 Petroleum Dock Port
 Adabiya Port
 Sokhna Port
 Nuwaiba Port
 Al-Tour Port
 Sharm El Sheikh Port
 Hurghada Port
 Safaga Port

Merchant marine 
In 2018, the number of Egypt's sea vessels, according to the CIA World Factbook is 399 as follows:

 bulk carrier: 14
 container ship: 8
 general cargo: 33
 petroleum tanker: 36
 Other: 308 (2017)

Airports 

Cairo International Airport is used by numerous international airlines, including the country's own Egypt Air and Nile Air.

Airports with paved runways
total: 72

over 3,047 m: 15

2,438 to 3,047 m: 36

1,524 to 2,437 m: 15

914 to 1,523 m: 0

under 914 m: 6 (2017)

Airports with unpaved runways
total: 11

2,438 to 3,047 m: 1

1,524 to 2,437 m: 3

914 to 1,523 m: 4

under 914 m: 3 (2013)

Heliports 

 7 (2013)

Monorail 

In 2015 plans to construct two monorail systems were announced, one linking October City to suburban Giza, a distance of 35 km, and the other linking Nasr City to New Cairo, a distance of 52 km. They will be Egypt's first monorail systems. In May 2019 the contract to build 70 four-car trains was awarded to Bombardier Transportation, Derby, England. Delivery of the trains is expected between 2021 and 2024. The network is to be built by Orascom Construction and Arab Contractors.

See also

 Transport in Cairo
 Arab Union for Land Transport Company
 List of bus companies in Egypt
 List of lighthouses in Egypt

External links
 Map
 Egyptian National Railways
 The Holding Company for Maritime and Land Transport

References